Kevin W. S. Roberts  was the Sir John Hicks Professor of Economics at the University of Oxford until his retirement in 2020.

He was a professorial fellow of Nuffield College, a fellow of the British Academy and a fellow of the Econometric Society.

Education 
Kevin Roberts gained his doctorate from the University of Oxford in 1977.

Fellowships 
 1987 Econometric Society.
 2007 British Academy.
 Professorial Fellow, Nuffield College.

Selected bibliography

Chapters in books

Journal articles 
1971–1980
 
 
 
 
 
 
 
 
 

1981–1990
 
 
 
 
 
 
 

1991–2000
 
 

2001–2010

Papers

References

External links 
 Profile: Kevin Roberts Department of Economics, University of Oxford
 Profile: Kevin Roberts Nuffield College, University of Oxford

Fellows of the British Academy
Fellows of the Econometric Society
Fellows of Nuffield College, Oxford
Living people
Microeconomists
Year of birth missing (living people)
Statutory Professors of the University of Oxford
Alumni of the University of Essex
Alumni of the University of Oxford